The 2016–17 Midland Football League season was the third in the history of the Midland Football League, a football competition in England.

Premier Division

The Premier Division featured 18 clubs which competed in the previous season, along with four new clubs:
 Coventry United, promoted from Division One
 Shawbury United, promoted from the West Midlands (Regional) League
 St Andrews, promoted from the East Midlands Counties League
 Tividale, relegated from the Northern Premier League

League table

Promotion criteria
To be promoted at the end of the season a team must:

 Have applied to be considered for promotion by the end of November	
 Pass a ground grading examination by the end of March	
 Finish the season in a position higher than that of any other team also achieving criteria 1 and 2	
 Finish the season in one of the top three positions
The following six teams achieved criterion one:
 Alvechurch
 Coleshill Town
 Coventry United
 Heanor Town
 Sporting Khalsa
 Westfields

Results

Locations

Division One

Division One featured 18 clubs which competed in the previous season, along with two new clubs:
 Chelmsley Town, promoted from Division Two
 Uttoxeter Town, joined from the Staffordshire County Senior League

League table

Results

Locations

Division Two 

Division Two featured 12 clubs which competed in the division last season, along with 4 new clubs:

Continental Star, demoted from Premier Division 
Leamington Hibernian, promoted from Division Three
Redditch Borough, promoted from Division Three
Smithswood Firs, promoted from Division Three

League table

Division Three

Division Three featured 10 clubs which competed in the division last season, along with 4 new clubs:

Castle Vale Town
Montpellier
Moors Academy
NKF Burbage, from Leicestershire Senior League

League table

References

External links
 Midland Football League

2016–17
9